Miss Europe 1949, was 13th edition of the Miss Europe pageant and the second under the Mondial Events Organization. It was held in Palermo, Sicily, Italy on September 17, 1949. Juliette Figueras of France, was crowned Miss Europe 1949.

Results

Placements

Contestants 

 - Maria Nadja Tiller
 - Andrča Bouillon
 - Elinor Wedel Hansen
 - Terttu Nyman
 -  Juliette Figueras
 - Elaine Pryce
 - Mary Jochemsen
 - Margaret Lalor
 - Anna Maria Visconti
 - Kerstin Ringberg
 - Noėlle Stern

Notes

Withdrawals

 Dominions (Great Britain) - June Mitchell (could not compete because Miss Great Britain was also in the pageant)
 - Irmgard Stroessinger

https://eresources.nlb.gov.sg/newspapers/Digitised/Article/straitstimes19491112-1.2.110

References

External links 
 

1949 beauty pageants
1949 in Italy
Beauty pageants in Italy
Miss Europe
Palermo